Reyntiens is a surname. Notable people with the surname include: 

Guy Reyntiens (1880–1932), Belgian equestrian
Patrick Reyntiens (1925–2021), British stained glass artist
Priscilla Reyntiens (1899–1991), British administrator